Tomographic reconstruction is a type of multidimensional inverse problem where the challenge is to yield an estimate of a specific system from a finite number of projections. The mathematical basis for tomographic imaging was laid down by Johann Radon. A notable example of applications is the reconstruction of computed tomography (CT) where cross-sectional images of patients are obtained in non-invasive manner. Recent developments have seen the Radon transform and its inverse used for tasks related to realistic object insertion required for testing and evaluating computed tomography use in airport security.

This article applies in general to reconstruction methods for all kinds of tomography, but some of the terms and physical descriptions refer directly to the reconstruction of X-ray computed tomography.

Introducing formula 

The projection of an object, resulting from the tomographic measurement process at a given angle , is made up of a set of line integrals (see Fig. 1). A set of many such projections under different angles organized in 2D is called sinogram (see Fig. 3). In X-ray CT, the line integral represents the total attenuation of the beam of x-rays as it travels in a straight line through the object. As mentioned above, the resulting image is a 2D (or 3D) model of the attenuation coefficient. That is, we wish to find the image . The simplest and easiest way to visualise the method of scanning is the system of parallel projection, as used in the first scanners. For this discussion we consider the data to be collected as a series of parallel rays, at position , across a projection at angle . This is repeated for various angles. Attenuation occurs exponentially in tissue:

where  is the attenuation coefficient as a function of position. Therefore, generally the total attenuation  of a ray at position , on the projection at angle , is given by the line integral:

Using the coordinate system of Figure 1, the value of  onto which the point  will be projected at angle  is given by:

So the equation above can be rewritten as

This function is known as the Radon transform (or sinogram) of the 2D object.

The Fourier Transform of the projection can be written as

       where    

Using the inverse Fourier transform, the inverse Radon transform formula can be easily derived.

where  is the derivative of the Hilbert transform of 

In theory, the inverse Radon transformation would yield the original image. The projection-slice theorem  tells us that if we had an infinite number of one-dimensional projections of an object taken at an infinite number of angles, we could perfectly reconstruct the original object, . However, there will only be a finite number of projections available in practice.

Reconstruction algorithms 
Practical reconstruction algorithms have been developed to implement the process of reconstruction of a 3-dimensional object from its projections.  These algorithms are designed largely based on the mathematics of the Radon transform, statistical knowledge of the data acquisition process and geometry of the data imaging system.

Fourier-Domain Reconstruction Algorithm 
Reconstruction can be made using interpolation. The Discrete Fourier transform on each projection will yield sampling in the frequency domain. Combining all the frequency-sampled projections would generate a polar raster in the frequency domain. The polar raster will be sparse so interpolation is used to fill the unknown DFT points and reconstruction can be done through inverse Discrete Fourier transform. Reconstruction performance may improve by designing methods to change the sparsity of the polar raster, facilitating the effectiveness of interpolation.

For instance, a concentric square raster in the frequency domain can be obtained by changing the angle between each projection as follow:

where  is highest frequency to be evaluated.

The concentric square raster improves computational efficiency by allowing all the interpolation positions to be on rectangular DFT lattice. Furthermore, it reduces the interpolation error. Yet, the Fourier-Transform algorithm has a disadvantage of producing inherently noisy output.

Back Projection Algorithm 
In practice of tomographic image reconstruction, often a stabilized and discretized version of the inverse Radon transform is used, known as the filtered back projection algorithm.

With a sampled discrete system, the inverse Radon Transform is

The name back-projection comes from the fact that 1D projection needs to be filtered by 1D Radon kernel (back-projected) in order to obtain a 2D signal. The filter used does not contain DC gain, thus adding DC bias may be desirable. Reconstruction using back-projection allows better resolution than interpolation method described above. However, it induces greater noise because the filter is prone to amplify high-frequency content.

Iterative Reconstruction Algorithm 

Iterative algorithm is computationally intensive but it allows to include a priori information about the system .

Let  be the number of projections,  be the distortion operator for th projection taken at an angle .  are set of parameters to optimize the conversion of iterations.

An alternative family of recursive tomographic reconstruction algorithms are the Algebraic Reconstruction Techniques and iterative Sparse Asymptotic Minimum Variance.

Fan-Beam Reconstruction 
Use of a noncollimated fan beam is common since a collimated beam of radiation is difficult to obtain.  Fan beams will generate series of line integrals, not parallel to each other, as projections. The fan-beam system will require 360 degrees range of angles which impose mechanical constraint, however, it allows faster signal acquisition time which may be advantageous in certain settings such as in the field of medicine. Back projection follows a similar 2 step procedure that yields reconstruction by computing weighted sum back-projections obtained from filtered projections.

Deep learning reconstruction 

Deep learning methods are widely applied to image reconstruction nowadays and have achieved impressive results in various image reconstruction tasks, including low-dose denoising, sparse-view reconstruction, limited angle tomography and metal artifact reduction. An excellent overview can be found in the special issue  of IEEE Transaction on Medical Imaging. One group of deep learning reconstruction algorithms apply post-processing neural networks to achieve image-to-image reconstruction, where input images are reconstructed by conventional reconstruction methods. Artifact reduction using the U-Net in limited angle tomography is such an example application. However, incorrect structures may occur in an image reconstructed by such a completely data-driven method, as displayed in the figure. Therefore, integration of known operators into the architecture design of neural networks appears beneficial, as described in the concept of precision learning. For example, direct image reconstruction from projection data can be learnt from the framework of filtered back-projection. Another example is to build neural networks by unrolling iterative reconstruction algorithms. Except for precision learning, using conventional reconstruction methods with deep learning reconstruction prior  is also an alternative approach to improve the image quality of deep learning reconstruction.

Tomographic reconstruction software 

For flexible tomographic reconstruction, open source toolboxes are available, such as PYRO-NN, TomoPy, CONRAD, ODL, the ASTRA toolbox, and TIGRE. TomoPy is an open-source Python toolbox to perform tomographic data processing and image reconstruction tasks at the Advanced Photon Source at Argonne National Laboratory. TomoPy toolbox is specifically designed to be easy to use and deploy at a synchrotron facility beamline. It supports reading many common synchrotron data formats from disk through Scientific Data Exchange, and includes several other processing algorithms commonly used for synchrotron data. TomoPy also includes several reconstruction algorithms, which can be run on multi-core workstations and large-scale computing facilities.  The ASTRA Toolbox is a MATLAB and Python toolbox of high-performance GPU primitives for 2D and 3D tomography, from 2009 to 2014 developed by iMinds-Vision Lab, University of Antwerp and since 2014 jointly developed by iMinds-VisionLab (now imec-VisionLab), UAntwerpen and CWI, Amsterdam. The toolbox supports parallel, fan, and cone beam, with highly flexible source/detector positioning. A large number of reconstruction algorithms are available through TomoPy and the ASTRA toolkit, including FBP, Gridrec, ART, SIRT, SART, BART, CGLS, PML, MLEM and OSEM. In 2016, the ASTRA toolbox has been integrated in the TomoPy framework. By integrating the ASTRA toolbox in the TomoPy framework, the optimized GPU-based reconstruction methods become easily available for synchrotron beamline users, and users of the ASTRA toolbox can more easily read data and use TomoPy's other functionality for data filtering and artifact correction.

Gallery 
Shown in the gallery is the complete process for a simple object tomography and the following tomographic reconstruction based on ART.

See also 
 Operation of computed tomography#Tomographic reconstruction
 Cone beam reconstruction
 Industrial CT scanning
 Industrial Tomography Systems

References

Further reading 
Avinash Kak & Malcolm Slaney (1988), Principles of Computerized Tomographic Imaging, IEEE Press, .
 Bruyant, P.P. "Analytic and iterative reconstruction algorithms in SPECT" Journal of Nuclear Medicine 43(10):1343-1358, 2002

External links 

Insight ToolKit; open source tomographic support software

ASTRA (All Scales Tomographic Reconstruction Antwerp) toolbox; very flexible, fast and open source software for computed tomographic reconstruction
NiftyRec; comprehensive open source tomographic reconstruction software; Matlab and Python scriptable
Open-source tomographic reconstruction and visualization tool

Radiology
Medical imaging
Inverse problems
Multidimensional signal processing
Signal processing
Tomography